Mato is a settlement in the island of Brava, Cape Verde. It is situated in the mountainous interior of the island, 2 km southwest of the island capital Nova Sintra.

References

Villages and settlements in Brava, Cape Verde